Nawalparasi (Bardaghat Susta West) 2 is one of two parliamentary constituencies of Nawalparasi (West of Bardaghat Susta) district in Nepal. This constituency came into existence on the Constituency Delimitation Commission (CDC) report submitted on 31 August 2017.

Incorporated areas 
Nawalparasi (Bardaghat Susta West) 2 incorporates Sunuwal Municipality, Ramgram Municipality, Palhi Nandan Rural Municipality and wards 1, 2 and 3 of Sarawal Rural Municipality.

Assembly segments 
It encompasses the following Lumbini Provincial Assembly segment

 Nawalparasi (Bardaghat Susta West) 2(A)
 Nawalparasi (Bardaghat Susta West) 2(B)

Members of Parliament

Parliament/Constituent Assembly

Provincial Assembly

2(A)

2(B)

Election results

Election in the 2020s

2022 general election

Election in the 2010s

2017 legislative elections

2017 Nepalese provincial elections

2(A)

2(B)

See also 

 List of parliamentary constituencies of Nepal

References

External links 

 Constituency map of Nawalparasi (Bardaghat Susta West)

Parliamentary constituencies of Nepal